Bozhidar Avramov (born March 8, 1990) is a Bulgarian professional basketball player. He currently plays for Balkan  of the Bulgarian National Basketball League. He is also a member of the Bulgarian national team.

References

External links
 Bozhidar Avramov at bgbasket.com

1990 births
Living people
BC Levski Sofia players
Bulgarian expatriate basketball people in Greece
Bulgarian expatriate basketball people in Spain
Bulgarian men's basketball players
CSU Asesoft Ploiești players
Greek Basket League players
Juvecaserta Basket players
Liga ACB players
Olympia Larissa B.C. players
PBC Academic players
BC Balkan Botevgrad players
Point guards
Sportspeople from Varna, Bulgaria
Valencia Basket players